is a Japanese basketball player. She competed at the 2020 Summer Olympics. and at the 2020 Summer Olympics, winning a silver medal.

Career 
She represented Japan in the 2018 FIBA U17 Women's Asian Championship, and 2019 FIBA U19 Women's Basketball Championship.

References

External links 

 Nanaka Todo #20 of the Japan Women's National Team plays defense on Julie Allemand #55 of the Belgium

Living people
2000 births
Basketball players at the 2020 Summer Olympics
Japanese women's basketball players
Guards (basketball)
Olympic basketball players of Japan
Olympic medalists in basketball
Olympic silver medalists for Japan
Medalists at the 2020 Summer Olympics